The Ministry of Finance of Serbia Building is a building of the Ministry of Finance of Serbia, located in Savski Venac, Belgrade, Serbia.

Architecture
It is the work of Russian architect Nikolay Petrovich Krasnov, the most important representative of the academic historicism in the Serbian interwar architecture. Due to the importance that the building has as an anthological work of Belgrade academic interwar architecture, it represents the immovable cultural property as the cultural monument. The building was constructed between 1926 and 1928, after the design by the architect Nikolay Krasnov, as the author of the original design of the building, and the later addition of the third floor from 1938.

The building is conceived as the monumental object at the crossroads of the busy Knez Miloš Street and Nemanjina Street. It has the square-shaped basis with the spacious inner courtyard. The interior was designed according to its purpose. The exquisite artistry of the facades reflects in the richness of the decorative architectural plastic, a number of details, studied ratio between the masses. The dynamic facades, designed in the style of аcademism, have massive pilasters, between the first and the second floor windows. The most luxurious is the corner part of the building, where the vertical effect is underlined by the dome with the bronze sculpture on its top – the personification of Yugoslavia (later renamed and representing the personification of Mother Serbia). This sculpture, as well as other free standing sculptures on the facades of the building, Fertility with cornucopia, Crafts, Industry and Mercury were the works of a sculptor Đorđe Jovanović. The choice of motifs and the symbols of the facade sculptures was determined by the institution located in the building. The symbolism of the motifs was determined by the activity of the institution the object was initially intended for. The Ministry of Finance of the Kingdom of Yugoslavia Building was designated as the cultural property.

In 1999 during the NATO bombing of Yugoslavia, the building was bombed and damaged, but renovated after the Kosovo War ended. Today, this building is a site of the Government of Serbia.

References

External links

 Republički zavod za zaštitu spomenika kulture – Beograd/Baza nepokretnih kulturnih dobara 
 Lista spomenika 

Government buildings in Serbia
Buildings and structures in Belgrade
Office buildings in Serbia
1928 establishments in Yugoslavia
1920s establishments in Serbia
Buildings and structures completed in 1928
Savski Venac